Events in the year 2011 in Estonia.

Incumbents
President: Toomas Hendrik Ilves
Prime Minister: Andrus Ansip

Events
January 1 – Estonia joins the Euro, Tallinn became the European Capital of Culture.
March 6 – 2011 Estonian parliamentary election

Arts and entertainment
 Estonia in the Eurovision Song Contest 2011.

Sports
Football (soccer) competitions: 2011 in Estonian football, Meistriliiga, Estonian Cup, Esiliiga
2011 Nordic Junior World Ski Championships

Deaths
Enn Klooren

See also
2011 in Estonian football
2011 in Estonian television

References